Erik Dalheim (born 4 October 1940 in Drammen) is a Norwegian politician for the Labour Party.

He was elected to the Norwegian Parliament from Buskerud in 1981, and was re-elected on four occasions.

Dalheim held various positions in Drammen municipality council from 1971 to 1983, serving as mayor in the periods 1975–1979. In 1971–1975 he was also a member of Buskerud county council.

References

1940 births
Living people
Labour Party (Norway) politicians
Members of the Storting
21st-century Norwegian politicians
20th-century Norwegian politicians